Sterlitamaksky District (Stärletamaq rayonı) is an administrative and municipal district (raion), one of the fifty-four in the Republic of Bashkortostan, Russia. It is located in the center of the republic and borders with Aurgazinsky District in the north, Gafuriysky District in the northeast, Ishimbaysky District in the east and southeast, Meleuzovsky District in the south, Sterlibashevsky District in the southwest, Miyakinsky District in the west, and with Alsheyevsky District in the west and northwest. Its administrative center is the city of Sterlitamak (which is not administratively a part of the district). As of the 2010 Census, the total population of the district was 40,325.

History
The district was established on August 20, 1930.

Administrative and municipal status
Within the framework of administrative divisions, Sterlitamaksky District is one of the fifty-four in the republic. It is divided into 20 selsoviets, comprising 111 rural localities. The city of Sterlitamak serves as its administrative center, despite being incorporated separately as a city of republic significance—an administrative unit with the status equal to that of the districts.

As a municipal division, the district is incorporated as Sterlitamaksky Municipal District. Its twenty selsoviets are incorporated as twenty rural settlements within the municipal district.  The city of republic significance of Sterlitamak is incorporated separately from the district as Sterlitamak Urban Okrug, but serves as the administrative center of the municipal district as well.

References

Notes

Sources

Districts of Bashkortostan
States and territories established in 1930